Minneiska may refer to:
 Minneiska, Minnesota, a city in the United States
 Minneiska Township, Wabasha County, Minnesota, a township in the United States
 Minneiska apple, a variety of apple sometimes sold under the brand SweeTango